The Tuscaloosa Warriors were a professional American football team based in Tuscaloosa, Alabama, and were members of the Southern Professional Football League (SPFL). The Warriors were under the ownership of Eddie Brightwell with both Bobby Jackson and Bobby Luna serving as player-coaches. For their lone 1963 season, the Warriors compiled an 8-7 record with home games being played at both Tuscaloosa County High School Stadium and Denny Stadium. Due to low home attendance, in May 1964 team ownership announced the franchise would be relocated to Columbus, Mississippi and compete as the Columbus Warriors for the 1964 season.

All-time results
The Warriors regular season schedule was released in June 1963 All non-league games are marked with an asterisk (*).

References 

American football teams established in 1963
American football teams disestablished in 1964
Sports in Tuscaloosa, Alabama
American football teams in Alabama
1963 establishments in Alabama
1964 disestablishments in Alabama